The 2016 African Men's Youth Handball Championship was the 7th edition of the tournament, organized by the African Handball Confederation, under the auspices of the International Handball Federation and held at the Palais des Sports de l'ACI 2000 in Bamako, Mali from September 2 to 9, 2016.

Tunisia was the champion and qualified, alongside the three remaining top teams. to the 2017 world championship.

Draw

Preliminary round

All times are local (UTC+0).

Group A

Group B

Knockout stage
Championship bracket

5-8th bracket

Final standings

Awards

See also
 2016 African Men's Handball Championship
 2016 African Men's Junior Handball Championship

References

External links

2016 in African handball
African Men's Youth Handball Championship
International handball competitions hosted by Kenya
Youth